Wadsworth City School District is a public school district in Wadsworth, Ohio. It serves over 4,000 students in grades K through 12 living in Wadsworth, Wadsworth Township, and portions of neighboring Guilford, Montville, and Sharon Townships. The district is divided into five neighborhood elementary schools housing grades K through 4, an intermediate School for 5th and 6th grades, a middle school for grades 7 and 8, and a high school for 9th through 12th grades.

 Wadsworth High School, grades 9–12
 Wadsworth Middle School, grades 7–8
 Central Intermediate School, grades 5–6
 Isham Elementary School, grades K–4
 Lincoln Elementary School, grades K–4 
 Franklin Elementary School, grades K–4
 Overlook Elementary School, grades K–4
 Valley View Elementary School, grades K–4

External links
Wadsworth City Schools official website
Contact information

Education in Medina County, Ohio
School districts in Ohio
Wadsworth, Ohio